Urophora pauperata is a species of tephritid or fruit flies in the genus Urophora of the family Tephritidae.

Distribution
Georgia, Turkey.

References

Urophora
Insects described in 1945
Diptera of Asia